The Cyborgs are Ukrainian servicemen who participated in defense of Donetsk International Airport during the war in eastern Ukraine (26 May 2014 – 22 January 2015), including fighting around the Donetsk International Airport (DIAP) and participants in breakthroughs to help defenders. They were all volunteers.

The origin of the name "Cyborgs" 
The science fiction term (short for cybernetic organism) means a biological organism that contains mechanical or electronic components that replace or complement its organs. Numerous examples from mass culture and non-fiction cyborgs are described as people with artificially enhanced physical or mental abilities: they tend to have excessive power, heightened sense, a computer brain, or a built-in weapon.

The word cyborg, meaning "defenders of Donetsk airport," was first used in September 2014 by an unknown pro-Russian militant. He then tried to explain why the advanced units of the separatists forces could not take up arms at the Donetsk airport, which is protected by several dozen Ukrainian servicemen with small arms.

This meaning was included in dictionaries. In particular, the dictionary of modern Ukrainian language and slang "Myslovo" recognized "cyborgs" as the word of 2014. The same year, the President of Ukraine Petro Poroshenko recorded a New Year's address with them. Other neologisms have appeared in the media: cyborgport, cyborgiada.

It is noteworthy that Kruty's heroes are now sometimes called "the first cyborgs".

Number of defenders 

At various times in the airport and the nearby village of Pisky fought special forces of the 3rd Special Purpose Regiment, 79th, 80th, 81st, 95th Air Assault Brigade, and 93rd Mechanized Brigade, 57th Motorized Brigade, 90th Airmobile Battalion, and 74th Separate Reconnaissance Battalion, fighters of the Dnipro-1 regiment, soldiers of the Volunteer Ukrainian Corps (VUC) and other formations.

The total number of servicemen involved in operations at the airport is difficult to establish, but the exact number of dead is known: 100 soldiers, including 4 missing (at least one of them is suspected to have defected). In addition to the dead, there are data on 290-305 wounded during the fighting.

Fighting path of "cyborgs"

2014 
 
In March 2014, during the Russian annexation of the Crimean peninsula, servicemen of the Armed Forces of Ukraine were involved in the protection of the Donetsk airport: from the 3rd separate special purpose regiment and the 95th separate airmobile brigade. The first (unsuccessful) attempt to seize the DIAP by supporters of the so-called DPR happened on 17 April 2014.

As of 26 November, the 81st separate mechanized brigade was included in the combat forces in the area of the Anti-Terrorist Operation. On 1 December, part of the 1st company-tactical group of the 90th battalion of the 81st was transferred as a garrison from the village Pisky to the airport.

As a result of regular peace talks, an agreement was reached on a complete ceasefire in the anti-terrorist operation zone starting at 10:00 on 9 December 2014. According to these agreements, the DIAP was to rotate through the "green corridor" - a checkpoint for separatists and Russian operatives. Ukrainian soldiers were restricted to carrying only firearms and a limited amount of ammunition. Separatists and Russian operatives have the right to search the checkpoint of servicemen of the Armed Forces of Ukraine.

2015 
The "green corridor", which Ukrainian soldiers called the "corridor of shame", lasted a little over a month. In January 2015, hostilities resumed.

At 14:56 there was a second explosion in the new terminal from the detonation of three tons of TNT - as a result, three floors of the terminal ceased to exist. Inside, less than half of the 55 defenders who remained, survived. The last 16 people surrendered on 21 January. The critically wounded were sent to the hospital, and the rest were tortured.

On 22 January 17, prisoners were forced to walk the streets of Donetsk in the so-called "Parade". The Ukrainian Prosecutor General's Office classifies such acts as a violation of the 1949 Geneva Convention relative to the Treatment of Prisoners of War.

Over the next few days, several dozen militants on the outskirts of the resort were killed by Ukrainian intelligence. On 27 January, the Armed Forces recaptured part of the airport to retrieve the bodies of seven dead soldiers.

The last five "cyborgs" were given to the Ukrainian side on 22 February 2015, as part of an exchange of 139 Ukrainian soldiers for 52 captured militants.

In March 2015, on the territory of the new terminal, Ukrainian prisoners under the escort of armed separatists cleared the debris and retrieved the bodies of their dead comrades. The remains were taken to the Donetsk morgue, and later transferred to the city of Dnipro.

Awards 

For the defense of the airport received the honorary title of Hero of Ukraine:

 soldier Branovytsky Igor Yevhenovych (23 August 2016, posthumously)
 junior sergeant Igor Zinich (14 October 2015, posthumously)
 senior lieutenant Zubkov Ivan Ivanovich (10 June 2015, posthumously)
 captain Kolodiy Serhiy Volodymyrovych (23 August 2016, posthumously)
 major Mezhevikin Yevhen Mykolayovych (14 October 2015)
 volunteer Tabala Serhiy Oleksandrovych (21 November 2016, posthumously)

On 27 January 2015, President Poroshenko awarded the tankers who on 22 January ensured the exit of Ukrainian units from the encirclement at the airport. In particular, Lieutenant Yevhen Honchar was awarded the Order of Bohdan Khmelnytsky III degree, Sergeant Konstantin Baltarga, soldier Volodymyr Sukhanin and gunner soldier Dmytro Trynoha the Order For Courage III degree.

19 October 2014 Oleksandr Turchynov, Chairman of The Verkhovna Rada of Ukraine, awarded Nine Ukrainian Soldiers Defending the Donetsk Airport with Named Fort Pistols.

The non-governmental award, the badge "For the Defense of Donetsk Airport", has been awarded by the NGO "Brothers of Ukraine" since 2015.

The value of the feat 

The defense of Donetsk airport lasted 242 days - only a week less than the siege of Sevastopol (2 November 1941 – 3 July 1942), and much longer than the defense of Brest Fortress (22 June – 20 July 1941) during the German-Soviet war.

The airport was of special importance for the logistics of the Armed Forces of Ukraine. After the enemy retained control of about 150 kilometers of the state border in May, the maintenance of airports was no longer a deterrent to Russian aggression. However, this territory could become a springboard for the attack of Ukrainian troops on Donetsk.

According to the results of the Minsk Protocol, the warring parties were to create a 30-kilometer demarcation zone between Russian troops and Ukrainian troops. In this regard, the field commanders of the militants decided to win a demonstrative political victory. They launched a frontal attack to declare that the Ukrainians had not left on their own and that the airport had been stormed by the time the 30-kilometer zone was created and Ukrainian troops were withdrawn.

Despite the retreat of the last defenders directly from the territory of the Donetsk airport, positions of the Ukrainian forces pass in close proximity to it, and therefore fighting of various intensity proceeded there for a long time.

According to Major General Oleg Mikats, the Ukrainian forces' hold of the airfield restrained the enemy's forces. The biggest battle of Debaltseve began after the fall of the DIAP, and if the Ukrainian military was not there, the Armed Forces could lose not only Debaltseve.

The losses of militants during the entire campaign amounted to at least 800 people killed and 1,500-2,000 wounded.

Honoring 

On 16 January, Ukrainians honor the memory of the defenders of Donetsk airport. This is a semi-official day of remembrance, established on the initiative of the cyborgs themselves. Funeral and commemorative events are held on this day, including with the participation of senior government officials. However, there are no available explanations as to why such a date was chosen.

20 January is also called Remembrance Day.

Ukrposhta issued a postage stamp in honor of the "cyborgs" (22 January 2020, cat. No. 1806, face value V).Commemorative coin of the NBU with a face value of ₴10 from the series "Armed Forces of Ukraine". The coin was put into circulation on 30 January 2018.

In honor of Igor Branovytsky a youth space "Natriy" was created in Kyiv, and the street was named.

"Cyborgs" in culture and art 

 Full-length documentary "The Ukrainians" by Leonid Kanter and Ivan Yasny (2015)
 Full-length feature film "Cyborgs: Heroes Never Die" by Akhtem Seitablayev (2017)
 Poem "Donetsk Airport" by Vladimir Tymchuk
 Collection of interviews and photos "AD 242. History of courage, brotherhood and self-sacrifice" (compiler Irina Shtogrin)
 Novel "Airport" by Sergey Loiko
 "Cyborgs" photo gallery by Sergey Loiko decorated the first column of the "Los Angeles Times" on 28 October 2014
 Numerous photo, art and book exhibitions
 Charity calendars with photos of the military
 The image of the airport control tower, from which the defenders made observations, completely shattered by tank shots, and the slogan "Cyborgs withstood, concrete could not withstand" became the property of mass culture.

References 

Donetsk
Russo-Ukrainian War
War in Donbas